The Lapskojis is a river of  Kėdainiai district municipality, Kaunas County, central Lithuania. It is the right tributary of the Šušvė river.

The name Lapskojis comes from Lithuanian lapės koja ('a leg of fox').

References

Rivers of Lithuania
Kėdainiai District Municipality